Niophis is a genus of beetles in the family Cerambycidae, containing the following species:

 Niophis antennata (Martins, Chemsak & Linsley, 1966)
 Niophis aper (Germar, 1824)
 Niophis bucki Martins & Monné, 1973
 Niophis coptorhina Bates, 1867
 Niophis neotropica (Martins, 1961)
 Niophis picticornis (Martins, 1964)
 Niophis rufula (Gounelle, 1909)

References

Ectenessini